Mason House may refer to:

Mason House (Bradford, Arkansas), listed on the NRHP in White County, Arkansas
Walt Mason House, in Emporia, Kansas, listed on the NRHP in Lyon County, Kansas
Peter Mason House, in Danville, Kentucky, listed on the NRHP in Boyle County, Kentucky
Sue Shelby Mason House, in Lancaster, Kentucky, listed on the NRHP in Garrard County, Kentucky
Mason House (Richmond, Kentucky), listed on the NRHP in Madison County, Kentucky
Haynes Mason House, in Upton, Kentucky, listed on the NRHP in Hardin County, Kentucky
Mason House (Shreveport, Louisiana), listed on the NRHP in Caddo Parish, Louisiana
Dr. Moses Mason House, in Bethel, Maine, listed on the NRHP in Oxford County, Maine
John Mason House (Lexington, Massachusetts), NRHP-listed
John Mason House (Winchester, Massachusetts), NRHP-listed
Josiah Mason Jr. House, in Cambridge, Massachusetts, NRHP-listed
N. S. Mason House, in Taunton, Massachusetts, NRHP-listed
W. A. Mason House, in Cambridge, Massachusetts, NRHP-listed
William P. Mason House, in Swansea, Massachusetts, NRHP-listed
John W. Mason House, in Fergus Falls, Minnesota, listed on the NRHP in Otter Tail County, Minnesota
 Mason House (Dublin, New Hampshire), NRHP-listed
Mason–Watkins House, in Surry, New Hampshire, NRHP-listed
George G. Mason House, in Webster, New York, NRHP-listed
Mason–Lloyd–Wiley House, Chapel Hill, North Carolina, historic house, home of Thomas F. Lloyd
John A. Mason House, in Farrington, North Carolina, listed on the NRHP in Chatham County, North Carolina
Mason–Hardee–Capel House, in Garysburg, North Carolina, listed on the NRHP in Northampton County, North Carolina
Frank H. Mason House, in Akron, Ohio, listed on the NRHP in Summit County, Ohio
John Wesley Mason Gothic Cottage, in Braceville, Ohio, listed on the NRHP in Trumbull County, Ohio
 Mason House (Coal Run, Ohio), NRHP-listed
James Mason House, in Mentor, Ohio, listed on the NRHP in Lake County, Ohio
Israel B. Mason House, Providence, Rhode Island, NRHP-listed
Charles T. Mason House, in Sumter, South Carolina, listed on the NRHP in Sumter County, South Carolina
Mason–Hughes House, in San Angelo, Texas, listed on the NRHP in Tom Green County, Texas
 Mason House (Guilford, Virginia), listed on the NRHP in Accomack County, Virginia
Mason–Tillett House, in Valentines, Virginia, NRHP-listed
Mason–Drennen House, in Drennen, West Virginia, NRHP-listed
James Mason House and Farm, in Hedgesville, West Virginia, NRHP-listed

See also
John Mason House (disambiguation)